The Penang Bridge International Marathon or Penang Bridge Marathon is an annual marathon event held at Penang Bridge in Penang, Malaysia, since 1984.  It is organised by Penang State Tourism Development office (PETACH) and fully supported by the Penang State Government. It is known as the biggest run in the country.  During the competition, participants run over the bridge and along a scenic coastal highway.

History 
The event started in 1984 as a road race from Esplanade to Gurney Drive. With the completion of Penang Bridge in 1985, it is usually held there in late November annually since 1986 with the exception of 2014, when the event was held at Sultan Abdul Halim Muadzam Shah Bridge which is also known as the Penang Second Bridge.

In 2006, after a break for a number of years, the Penang Bridge International Marathon was revived as "a combination" of the Penang International Marathon, which was last held in 1999, and the Penang Bridge Run, which had been held from 1992 to 2003.

In 2020, the competition was rebranded with the introduction of the new logo as well as the tagline "The Asian Challenge", reflecting the vision of making it into an internationally acknowledged marathon run event.

Controversies 
In 2016, the event was rescheduled in order to accommodate requests from the parents of schoolchildren, causing trouble for runners who had already booked flights for the race.

In 2017, there were a number of issues, including issuing shirts of incorrect sizes, running out of water, handing out expired chocolate bars, delaying the reporting of results, and denying some podium finishers an onstage presentation. In addition, some runners waited for two hours for finisher medals, and over three hours for food.

Cancellations 
In 2018, the 10k race was cancelled for the first time "due to heavy rain and lightning", with all registered runners given finisher medals as a consolation.

The 2020 in-person edition of the race was cancelled due to the coronavirus pandemic, with all entries automatically transferred to 2021, and all registrants given the option of transferring their entry to another runner.

Course 

The current version of the marathon runs on a loop course that begins and ends at the outdoor car park of the Queensbay Mall.

The course first enters Tun Dr Lim Chong Eu Expressway, which runs along the eastern coast of Penang Island, with runners first running south and then back up north before turning back south to cross the  bridge. Shortly after crossing the bridge, runners turn around and run across the bridge again, before heading south to finish back at the Queensbay Mall.

Other races 
The Penang Bridge International Marathon also incorporates a half-marathon event and a 10-km run event. The competition also had an 8 km fun run event, but it was removed in 2018 as part of rebranding exercise. The organiser originally planned to remove the 10-km run competition as well by 2020, but chose to continue due to popular demand.

Winners

Full marathon
Key: Course record

Notes

References

External links
 Penang Bridge International Marathon website

Marathons in Malaysia
Sport in Penang